Dehler is a surname. Notable people with the surname include:

Robert Dehler  (1889–1966), Canadian-born Roman Catholic bishop
Steve Dehler (born 1950), American politician and businessman
Steven Dehler (born 1987), American model, actor and dancer
Thomas Dehler (1897–1967), German politician

See also
Dehler Park, multi-use stadium in Billings, Montana
Dehler Yachts, German brand of sailing yachts

References